Bostrodes is a genus of moths of the family Noctuidae. The genus was erected by George Hampson in 1910.

Species
Bostrodes proleuca Hampson, 1910 Java
Bostrodes rubrifusa (Hampson, 1907) Sri Lanka
Bostrodes rufisecta Warren, 1912 Khasi Hills of India
Bostrodes sagittaria Warren, 1912 Khasi Hills
Bostrodes tenuilinea Warren, 1913 Khasi Hills

References

Acontiinae